Rajbari Government High School is a secondary school in Rajbari, Bangladesh. It was founded in 1892.

References 

High schools in Bangladesh
Rajbari District
1892 establishments in British India
Educational institutions established in 1892